Panagiotis "Pete" Papahronis (alternate spelling: Papachronis) (born October 17, 1967) is a former Greek–American professional basketball player.

Professional career
Papahronis graduated from East Central University in 1989, and the same year he joined to P.A.O.K. BC along with his cousin Chris Papasarantou. He played four years with PAOK and he won the 1991 and the Greek League champion in 1992. At the final against Zaragoza, Papahronis disqualified with five fouls at the beginning of the second half. Moreover, he was one of the most special players of PAOK's fans.

In 1992, he moved to Iraklis Thessaloniki B.C. as an exchange for Christos Tsekos transfer. Papahronis played four years with Iraklis and they reached at the semifinals of the 1994–95 FIBA European Cup. His best season was 1993–94, when he has 10.6 points per game at Greek Basketball League. In 1996, he signed with AEK, having confined participation. He also played with Iraklio B.C. and Maroussi B.C., finishing his career in 2000.

Coaching career
Papahronis returned to the United States and became a high school basketball coach. In 2003, he joined Guthrie High School, and led its boys' team in five state tournaments, winning the consecutive titles in 2008 and 2009. In 2012, he became coach of the girls' team. In 2014, he was hired by Edmond North High School and assumed coaching the girls' team as well as teaching a recreational basketball course.

Personal
His daughter Elle (Eleni) joined at San Francisco Dons.

References

External links 
at esake.gr
at fibaeurope.com

1967 births
Living people
AEK B.C. players
American people of Greek descent
East Central Tigers men's basketball players
East Central University alumni
Greek men's basketball players
Greek Basket League players
Irakleio B.C. players
Iraklis Thessaloniki B.C. players
Maroussi B.C. players
P.A.O.K. BC players
American men's basketball players
Power forwards (basketball)
Basketball players from Oklahoma